Grancalcin is a protein that in humans is encoded by the GCA gene.

This gene product, grancalcin, is a calcium-binding protein abundant in neutrophils and macrophages. It belongs to the penta-EF-hand subfamily of proteins which includes sorcin, calpain, and ALG-2. Grancalcin localization is dependent upon calcium and magnesium. In the absence of divalent cation, grancalcin localizes to the cytosolic fraction; with magnesium alone, it partitions with the granule fraction; and in the presence of magnesium and calcium, it associates with both the granule and membrane fractions, suggesting a role for grancalcin in granule-membrane fusion and degranulation.

Interactions
GCA (gene) has been shown to interact with SRI.

References

Further reading

Penta-EF-hand proteins